The Capay Formation is a geologic formation in Yolo County, western Sacramento Valley, California. It preserves fossils dating back to the Paleogene period.

See also

 List of fossiliferous stratigraphic units in California
 Paleontology in California

References
 

Paleogene California
Geologic formations of California
Geography of Yolo County, California
Geography of the Sacramento Valley